Thomas Joseph Donovan  (January 1, 1873 – March 25, 1933) was a Major League Baseball outfielder who played for one season. He played for the Cleveland Blues for 18 games from September 10 to September 28, 1901. His brother, Jerry Donovan, also played in the majors.

External links

1873 births
1933 deaths
Cleveland Blues (1901) players
Major League Baseball outfielders
Baseball players from New York (state)
Albany Senators players
Troy Trojans (minor league) players
Allentown Colts players
Troy Washerwomen players
Scranton Indians players
Brockton Shoemakers players
Amsterdam Red Stockings players
Springfield Ponies players
Tacoma Rabbits players
Tacoma Colts players
Meriden Bulldogs players
Newark Colts players
New London Whalers players
Norwich Witches players
Providence Clamdiggers (baseball) players
Utica Pentups players
Utica Pent-Ups players
Binghamton Bingoes players
Ilion Typewriters players